Folkestone to Etchinghill Escarpment is a  biological and geological Site of Special Scientific Interest on the northern outskirts of Folkestone in Kent. It is a Special Area of Conservation. The reserve has a Geological Conservation Review site.

A large area of chalk grassland has three nationally rare plants, and Asholt Wood has outstanding lichen flora. The site also includes Holywell Coombe, a key geological site displaying the sequence of mollusc fossils in the late Pleistocene and Holocene.

References

Sites of Special Scientific Interest in Kent
Nature Conservation Review sites
Geological Conservation Review sites